Neolepocreadium is a genus of trematodes in the family Aephnidiogenidae.

Species
Neolepocreadium ampahan Machida, 2012
Neolepocreadium caballeroi Thomas, 1960
Neolepocreadium trachinoti Madhavi, Narasimhulu & Shameem, 1986

References

Aephnidiogenidae
Trematode genera